The 2007 timeline of the insurgency in Khyber Pakhtunkhwa:

28 April: Charsadda rally bombing 

On 28 April, a suicide bomber killed 22 people at a political rally in Charsadda, North-West Frontier Province.

3–11 July: Lal Masjid siege 

On 3 July, the militant supporters of the Lal Masjid and Pakistani security forces clashed in Islamabad after the students from the mosque attacked a nearby government ministry building. The Pakistani security forces immediately put up a siege around the mosque complex which lasted until 11 July and resulted in 109 deaths. This represented the main catalyst for the conflict and eventual breakdown of the truce that existed between Pakistan and the Taliban in the northwest. During the siege there were several attacks in Waziristan, Federally Administered Tribal Areas, in retaliation for the siege.

14–15 July: Attacks and end of truce 
At least 75 Pakistanis, including soldiers and police recruits, were killed in three attacks on 14 and 15 July.

In a statement issued in Miranshah, the main town, the militants accused the government of breaking the agreement. "We are ending the agreement today," the Taliban Shura or Council said in pamphlets distributed in Miranshah, the capital of North Waziristan.

On 14 July 2007 a suicide bomber attacked a Pakistani Army convoy, killing 26 soldiers and wounding 54. On 15 July 2007, two suicide bombers attacked another Pakistani Army convoy killing 16 soldiers and 5 civilians and wounding another 47 people. In a separate incident, a fourth suicide bomber attacked a police headquarters, killing 28 police officers and recruits and wounding 35 people.

15–19 July: Waves of attack 
From 15 July to 19, waves of attacks in Balochistan and NWFP killed over 200 people. On 17 July, a suicide bomber hit a rally featuring the country's suspended chief justice in Pakistan's capital Islamabad killing 15 people and wounding 44. Chief Justice Iftikhar Muhammad Chaudhry was travelling to the rally and was about three miles away when the attacker struck near the stage set up for him.

20 July: Car bombing in Karachi averted 
On 20 July panic gripped evening shoppers at a Clifton shopping mall in Karachi, Sindh, when a bomb was defused immediately after it had been found in a car parked in a nearby parking area. An anonymous caller informed the Citizens-Police Liaison Committee that a bomb was planted in the car parked near the Park Towers. The shopping mall was the venue of a Harry Potter book launch and was packed with shoppers. Investigators said that the car carrying the bomb had been stolen from the Ferozabad police limits on 10 July and it had 4 kilograms of explosives. The bomb disposal squad (BDS) defused the bomb as the BDS officials severed the wiring connecting the boxes with the car's battery.

21 July - 2 September: Army moves into Waziristan 
The Army moved large concentration of troops into Waziristan and had engaged in fierce clashes with militants in which at least 100 militants had been killed including wanted terrorist and former Guantanamo Bay detainee, Abdullah Mehsud. The militants also struck back in attacking Army convoys, security checkpoints and sending suicide bombers which has killed over 50 soldiers and police and over 100 civilians. In one month of fighting during the period from 24 July to 24 August 250 militants and 60 soldiers were killed. On 2 September, just a few militants managed to ambush a 17-vehicle army convoy and captured an estimated 240 soldiers in it, without a shot being fired; an event that shocked the nation. Seven officers were among the held. Following this, there has been widespread anger at the Pakistan Army within Pakistan.

September: Army garrisons in Waziristan attacked
The army garrisoned the areas and set up checkpoints, but the militants hit hard - overrunning many checkpoints and kidnapping many soldiers in ambushes.

On 12 September, the first outpost was attacked and overrun by the Taliban, kidnapping 12 Pakistani soldiers.

The next day on 13 September, a suicide bomber in Ghazi Tarbela attacked a Pakistani army base, destroying the main mess hall and killing 20 members of the Karar commando group; Pakistan's most elite army unit. Another 29 soldiers were wounded.

A series of attacks ensued and by 20 September, a total of five Pakistani Army military outposts had been overrun and more than 25 soldiers captured.

21 December: Charsadda mosque bombing

On 21 December, a suicide bomber killed about 50 people and injured about 100 others in a mosque in Charsadda District, NWFP.

List of attacks

References 

Timeline

Timelines of military conflicts since 1945
Wars involving the Taliban
Waziristan